Thessalonica in the Middle Ages may refer to the city Thessalonica, (capital of Praetorian prefecture of Illyricum after 379 AD), Thessalonica (theme) or to the Latin Kingdom of Thessalonica.

Sack of Thessalonica

The Sack of Thessalonica (904) by the Muslim navy under the leadership of the Greek convert to Islam, Leo of Tripolis

Battles of Bulgarian-Byzantine wars

 Battle of Thessalonica (996) - Bulgarian victory over the Byzantines
 Battle of Salonica (1014) - Byzantine victory over the Bulgarians
 Battle of Salonica (1040) - Bulgarian victory over the Byzantines
 Battle of Salonica (2nd 1040) - Byzantine victory over the Bulgarians

Kingdom of Thessalonica

After the Fourth Crusade Thessalonica (Greek: Θεσσαλονίκη, Thessalonikē) became the capital of the Kingdom of Thessalonica created for Boniface of Montferrat.  In 1224 the city was taken by Theodore Komnenos Doukas of Epirus, whose family maintained itself in control until 1246.  In that year Thessalonica was annexed to the Empire of Nicaea and thus returned under Byzantine rule.  Nevertheless, the city and its environs became a special jurisdiction entrusted to the rule of various members of the imperial house from 1376 until its cession to Venice in 1423.  During the intervening period Thessalonica successfully withstood the attacks of the Catalan Company in 1308 and of Stefan Uroš IV Dušan in 1334.

Zealots of Thessalonica
In the period 1342–1349 Thessalonica was a virtually independent commune in the hands of the Zealots.

Ottoman siege and conquest

The city fell to the Turks in 1387 after an attack begun in 1383.  It was recovered for the Byzantine Empire by the terms of the treaty signed with the Ottoman Empire in 1403.  Unable to hold Thessalonica against the Turks, its ruler, the despot Andronikos Palaiologos ceded it to Venice in 1423, but the Venetians were unable to prevent its fall to the Turks in 1430.

See also
Mauros
Massacre of Thessalonica
Thessalonica (theme)

References

External links
Photos of byzantine buildings in Thessaloniki

 
Despotate of Epirus